Lysergic acid 2-butyl amide (2-Butyllysergamide, LSB) is an analogue of LSD originally developed by Richard Pioch at Eli Lilly in the 1950s, but mostly publicised through research conducted by the team led by David E. Nichols at Purdue University. It is a structural isomer of LSD, with the two ethyl groups on the amide nitrogen having been replaced by a single sec-butyl group, joined at the 2-position. It is one of the few lysergamide derivatives to exceed the potency of LSD in animal drug discrimination assays, with the (R) isomer having an ED50 of 33nmol/kg for producing drug-appropriate responding, vs 48nmol/kg for LSD itself. The corresponding (R)-2-pentyl analogue has higher binding affinity for the 5-HT1A and 5-HT2A receptors, but is less potent in producing drug-appropriate responding, suggesting that the butyl compound has a higher efficacy at the receptor target. The drug discrimination assay for LSD in rats involves both 5-HT1A and 5-HT2A mediated components, and while lysergic acid 2-butyl amide is more potent than LSD as a 5-HT1A agonist, it is slightly less potent as a 5-HT2A agonist, and so would probably be slightly less potent than LSD as a hallucinogen in humans. The main use for this drug has been in studies of the binding site at the 5-HT2A receptor through which LSD exerts most of its pharmacological effects, with the stereoselective activity of these unsymmetric monoalkyl lysergamides foreshadowing the subsequent development of compounds such as lysergic acid 2,4-dimethylazetidide (LSZ).

See also 
 Lysergic acid 3-pentyl amide
 Methylisopropyllysergamide

References 

Lysergamides
Eli Lilly and Company brands
Designer drugs